Miejski Klub Sportowy Start Radziejów is a football club from Radziejów, Poland. It was founded in 1948. In 2011, it played in the Polish Fourth League (V level)

References
 Information about the club on 90minut.pl

Association football clubs established in 1948
1948 establishments in Poland
Radziejów County
Football clubs in Kuyavian-Pomeranian Voivodeship